Montréjeau or Montréjeau-Gourdan-Polignan is a railway station in Gourdan-Polignan, Occitanie, France. The station opened on 9 June 1862 and is located on the Toulouse – Bayonne and the Montréjeau–Luchon railway lines. The station is served by Intercités (long distance) and TER (local) services operated by the SNCF.

Train services
The following services currently call at Montréjeau:
intercity services (Intercités) Hendaye–Bayonne–Pau–Tarbes–Toulouse
local service (TER Occitanie) Toulouse–Saint-Gaudens–Tarbes–Pau

References

Railway stations in Haute-Garonne
Railway stations in France opened in 1862